A doorman, also known as doorkeeper, is someone who is posted at, and often guards, a door, or by extension another entrance (specific similar terms exist, e.g. gatekeeper, hall porter). Specific uses include:

Professions 
 Doorman (profession), hired to provide courtesy and security services at a residential building or hotel
 Bouncer, a person employed by a nightclub or similar establishment to prevent troublemakers from entering or to eject them from the premises
 Usher (occupation), often ceremonial
 Ostiarius, ecclesiastical minor order
 Doorkeeper (Houses of Parliament), badged officer of the United Kingdom Houses of Parliament
 Doorkeeper of the United States House of Representatives

Books 
 The Doorman (El Portero), a novel by Reinaldo Arenas
 Doorman (comics), a Marvel Comics fictional superhero

Film and TV 
 "The Doorman" (Seinfeld), a 1995 episode of the American TV series
 The Doorman (1950 film), a 1950 film starring Cantinflas
 The Doorman, a 2005 film starring Dominique Vandenberg
 The Doorman, a 2007 film directed by Peter Bogdanovich
 The Doorman (2020 film), a 2020 action thriller starring Ruby Rose and Jean Reno
 Dead as a Doorman, a 1986 film starring Bradley Whitford

Music 
 "Doorman", a rock song by Stereophonics from the 2005 album Language. Sex. Violence. Other?
 "Doorman", a song by British rapper Slowthai and featuring Mura Masa from his 2019 album Nothing Great About Britain

Other uses 
 Karel Doorman, Dutch Rear Admiral who died in 1942 during the Battle of the Java Sea
 , a Second World War Dutch merchant ship
 Doorman, a village in Kunduz Province in Afghanistan

See also 
 Chancellor, originally posted at a door post

Surnames of Dutch origin